The Schwabenbräu Cup (1988–1990), Hofbräu Cup (1992–1997) or Dekra Open (1999–2000) was a short professional multi-day cycling race held annually in Germany.

Winners

Stage winners

1988 Schwabenbräu Cup

1989 Schwabenbräu Cup

1990 Schwabenbräu Cup

1992 Hofbräu Cup

1993 Hofbräu Cup

1994 Hofbräu Cup

1995 Hofbräu Cup

1996 Hofbräu Cup

1997 Hofbräu Cup

1999 Dekra Open

2000 Dekra Open

External links
 Results at Cyclingarchive

Cycle races in Germany
Cycle races in France
Recurring sporting events established in 1988
1988 establishments in West Germany
Recurring sporting events disestablished in 2000
Defunct cycling races in Germany
Men's road bicycle races
Sports competitions in Stuttgart
2000 disestablishments in Germany